Machias Seal Island is an island in disputed water between the Gulf of Maine and the Bay of Fundy, about  southeast from Cutler, Maine, and  southwest of Grand Manan Island, New Brunswick. Sovereignty of the island is disputed by the United States and Canada. The Canadian Coast Guard continues to staff a lighthouse on the island; the first lighthouse was constructed there in 1832.

Geography 
The relationship of Machias Seal Island to the Grand Manan archipelago is a source of some dispute among geologists. The island is considered to be a possible continuation of the series of exposed shoals, rocks, and islets strewn south and west of Grand Manan Island. The deeper Grand Manan Channel lies to the north and west of the island, separating it from the coast of Washington County, Maine.

Machias Seal Island is a barren island and devoid of trees. Because of its location at the boundary between the Gulf of Maine and the Bay of Fundy, Machias Seal Island is fog-bound for many days of the year. It is also a sanctuary for seabirds such as Atlantic puffins, razorbills, common murres, common and Arctic terns, Leach's storm-petrels, and common eiders.

It is a neighbour to North Rock.

History 
Likely used by the Passamaquoddy Nation in the pre-European era, Machias Seal Island was never actively nor successfully settled during the years when the French and the British were exploring this part of North America. The island was largely ignored by both Great Britain and the United States during the American Revolutionary War. The Treaty of Paris ended the conflict surrounding the American Revolutionary War. Article 2 attempted to establish the boundaries between the United States and British North America and part of this text stated the following:

The "northwest angle" of Nova Scotia refers to what is today New Brunswick, and the Canada–U.S. border still follows today the St. Croix River and a line due north from its source.
Once the St. Croix River was unambiguously identified following a commission provided by Jay's Treaty of 1794, it became clear that Machias Seal Island, as well as Grand Manan Island, was within 20 leagues of the shores of the United States and south of the line drawn due east from the mouth of the St. Croix River, but it remained unclear whether they were within the defined limits of Nova Scotia. These limits are written in the original text of the land grant dated 1621 to Sir William Alexander (founder of Nova Scotia) in which all "... islands, or seas lying near to, or within six leagues of any part ... of the said coasts" are deemed part of Nova Scotia. Machias Seal Island lies within 3.5 leagues from Grand Manan Island and 3 leagues from the coast of Maine, although Britain would later cease its claims on other islands in eastern Maine, such as Moose Island.

These ambiguities resulted in both countries claiming several islands in Passamaquoddy Bay, Grand Manan Island, and nearby islands. During the War of 1812, the United Kingdom occupied coastal Maine extending from the border with New Brunswick (created from Nova Scotia in 1784) west to the Penobscot River valley. During this time, tolls were charged upon residents at various occupied harbours in the area. The UK withdrew their forces upon signing the Treaty of Ghent in 1814, with the stipulation being that the boundary should be better delineated in the area of the Grand Manan Channel. In 1817, the decision of a joint commission declared that Moose, Dudley, and Frederick Islands belong to the United States, while Grand Manan and all other islands of the Passamaquoddy Bay belong to Canada.

The Treaty of Ghent states in Article Four

Machias Seal Island, not an island of the Passamaquoddy Bay but near Grand Manan and the coast of Maine, is not directly mentioned. Britain established possession of Machias Seal Island, under pressure from shipping interests at the burgeoning port of Saint John, New Brunswick set up a lighthouse in 1832. There is no indication of either nation having a presence on the island prior to 1832. Later boundary treaties and negotiations extended the seaward boundary in the Grand Manan Channel in 1908–1910 to its present terminus, roughly equidistant between Grand Manan Island and the coast of Maine, and several dozen kilometres (miles) northeast of Machias Seal Island.

Canadian interest 
The United Kingdom, and later Canada, have maintained an ongoing interest in the island, largely through the continuous occupation of the lighthouse. Until the 1970s–1980s, lighthouse keepers from the Canadian Coast Guard would live on the island with their families, receiving supplies by sea from Grand Manan or Saint John. Since 1944, the island has been protected under its designation as the Machias Seal Island Migratory Bird Sanctuary (a wildlife and seabird sanctuary), managed by the Canadian Wildlife Service. No private citizen in Canada has made an ownership claim to Machias Seal Island, and Canada considers the property to be wholly owned by the federal government. The island has long been included in federal and provincial electoral districts, and policing has been enforced on the island by Royal Canadian Mounted Police and on waters surrounding the island by the Department of Fisheries and Oceans. In the 20th century, some Canadian residents placed mining claims on the island as an exercise of sovereignty, despite the fact that it is considered a protected area.

United States interest 
In 1918, with Canadian agreement, a small detachment of U.S. Marines was placed on the island following the U.S. entry into the First World War, as a means to assist in protecting the territory and its key lighthouse guarding the entrance to the Bay of Fundy from German U-boat attack. These forces were withdrawn after several months, and no U.S. presence has been re-established since.

Gulf of Maine boundary 
Sovereignty of Machias Seal Island (and North Rock)  would likely not still be in question today if it were not for the decision by Canada and the United States to avoid settling this issue in their 1979 joint application to the International Court of Justice (ICJ) at The Hague in the Netherlands to have the maritime boundary delineated in the Gulf of Maine for fishing and mineral exploration purposes on Georges Bank.

The October 12, 1984, ICJ ruling, Delimitation of the Maritime Boundary in the Gulf of Maine Area (Canada/United States of America), has since highlighted a gap in the maritime boundary for several dozen kilometres (miles) between the current end of the Canada–U.S. border and the 1984 Gulf of Maine boundary starting point. Machias Seal Island and North Rock lie in the middle of this "grey zone"—a term coined by fishermen from both countries, referring to unclear jurisdictional boundaries in the area.

Conflict in grey zone 
The "grey zone" is a 72 km (45 mi) gap between Canada and the United States that was designated in 1977. Without clear ownership of the area, both countries assert fishing efforts that have strained the lobster population and its respective economies. Rules and rights over the "grey zone" are governed by political and social factors, such as increased lobster fishing efforts and different management styles, which becomes a source of conflict when more than one entity seeks to control the space. These political and social factors accentuate resource competition and eventually lead to conflict. The Department of Fisheries and Oceans (DFO) governs the Canadian lobster fisheries, but the United States' fisheries are governed both by the federal and the state governments. The Atlantic States Marine Fisheries Commission governs the federal zone of 4.8 and 320 km (3 and 200 mi) off of Maine, and the state government controls the area within 4.8 km (3 mi) offshore.

Canada and the United States separately manage their fisheries' guidelines regarding the use of the "grey zone." The international grey zone boundary led to a fishery dispute between Canadian and US lobster fishers that began in August 2002, when climate change began pushing lobster migration to the area. Within the disputed territory, Canadian and American trap fishers compete to fish for a valuable marine resource, lobster, and do not agree on management and conservation efforts. Fishers from both countries are impacted by drivers of change, including an economic imperative for growth, historical institutional failure in managing the ocean and coastal environment, and a changing social-ecological environment.

Those issues are exacerbated by political and social factors including a lack of clear rules for both sides, which leaves both sides to perceive that the other side is taking what is perceived to be theirs. Both sides express a perception of unfair treatment from the opposing government but are in fact similarly impacted by continuing poor governance and management over the region. Direct conflict arises between fishers from both countries as they feel that their well-being is threatened, and they attempt to take matters into their own hands. That has led to destruction of each other's property and threats of harm. That tied hand in hand with the unfair treatment of fishermen who were trying to fish in the grey zone, an area that was deemed “undisputed land.” The reliance on lobster fishing from both the Canadian and American sides quickly became competitive for lobster.

Both Canadian and American fishers have expressed concern about conservation and their need for security of supply; however, the continued escalation of the conflict between them only fuels damage to stocks and puts future harvests at risk for fishers of both countries. Canadians favored closure of the summer season to all fishers so that the lobster population had the opportunity to spawn and reproduce; Americans favored maximum catch limitations. Canadian fisheries perceived a decrease in their catch due to American fishing efforts during the Canadian off-season and responded by allowing their fisheries to operate during the same time period. The conflict over the "grey zone" was exacerbated when both countries' catch declined as well as the lobster population. The overlying issue is conservation of the lobster population; however, the governing bodies from Canada and the United States have differing opinions regarding management. This lack of cooperation from both nations perpetuated conflict that led to stock depletion.

Current status 

There are few or no mineral or petroleum resources in the "grey zone" although there is a valuable lobster fishery, and fishermen from both countries exploit the lack of rules in the "gray zone" by overfishing various species.

In 1995, the Canadian Coast Guard dramatically reduced the number of manned lighthouses on the Atlantic coast as a cost-saving measure. Today, all lighthouses in Eastern Canada except for the station on Machias Seal Island are unmanned. The Machias Seal Island light had been automated several years prior to the announcement, but Global Affairs Canada is now covering the Canadian Coast Guard's costs to maintain lightkeepers on Machias Seal Island "for sovereignty purposes.'

The DFO had issued an updated sustainability development strategy to involve a commitment to knowledge and technology for sustainable development between 2001 and 2003. The two goals were to better understand the nature and use of marine and fresh water resources and ecosystems to support decision making, and to effectively apply that knowledge and new technology to support safe and sustainable use of marine and freshwater resources.

Using the residence on the island, two lightkeepers are permanently staffed there. Flown by helicopter from the coast guard base in Saint John, they are rotated every four weeks. The Coast Guard employees also assist the Canadian Wildlife Service in maintaining the Migratory Bird Sanctuary and help any wildlife researchers who may stay on the island for a period of time.

See also 
 List of areas disputed by Canada and the United States
 List of islands of Maine
 List of islands of New Brunswick
 List of lighthouses in Maine
 List of lighthouses in New Brunswick

References

Further reading

External links 
 Canadian Department of Foreign Affairs
 Canadian Wildlife Service
 Atlantic Laboratory For Avian Research (ALAR) conducts scientific research on Machias Seal Island.
 Bold Coast Charter Company Commercial boat tours to island during summer
 Aids to Navigation Canadian Coast Guard
 Lobster War: The Fight Over the World's Richest Fishing Grounds (movie documentary)

Canada–United States border disputes
Territorial disputes of Canada
Coastal islands of New Brunswick
Disputed islands
Landforms of Charlotte County, New Brunswick
Islands of Washington County, Maine
Seabird colonies
Protected areas of New Brunswick
Lighthouses in New Brunswick
Islands of Maine
Coastal islands of Maine